The Mariinskaya Gymnasium in Taganrog on Chekhov Str. 104 - currently school No. 15 of the North Caucasus Railway – originated from two oldest educational establishments in the South of Russia: the Mariinskaya Gymnasium for Girls and the Railway Vocational School.

History of Gymnasium 
The present building of the gymnasium was constructed in 1875 by the architect Zagoskin.

In 1861 a school for girls had been opened in Taganrog and later renamed Mariinskaya Gymnasium for Girls. Well-known personalities were among the educators: Pavel Filevsky, F. Braslavsky, Edmund Dzerzhinsky, D. Ponyatovsky and others. Among the students were such eminent people as the People's Artist of the USSR Faina Ranevskaya, artist Seraphima Blonskaya, poets Sophia Parnok and Yelizaveta Tarakhovskaya, an active member of Narodnaya Volya organization Nadezhda Sigida (Malaksiano), Anton Chekhov’s sister Maria.

The Railway Vocational School with the 4-year course of studies was opened in Taganrog on September 1, 1896, on the initiative of a group of railway employees headed by the district superintendent E. Trik. After the Soviet power had been established in Taganrog, the Railway Vocational School was transformed into the 7-year labor school No 6, which moved into the building of the Mariinskaya Gymnaium in 1920.

Several generations of teachers devoted themselves to making the School No 15 one of the most respected educational establishments in the city. Since the school was attached to the North Caucasus Railway and subordinate to the Ministry of Communications, the school principals had a formal pretext for screening students and sending backward pupils, who had no relatives in the railway system, to other schools nearby. It allowed the authorities to preserve its traditions and maintain high standards of education.

In 1993 the School No 15 regained the status of gymnasium.

Famous graduates 
 Girls' Gymnasium
 Faina Ranevskaya, actress
 Sophia Parnok, poet,
 Nadezhda Sigida, revolutionary
 Yelizaveta Tarakhovskaya, poet and writer
 Seraphima Blonskaya, artist
 Maria Chekhova, teacher, artist

 School no.15
  Semyon Morozov, Hero of the Soviet Union

Old and Modern Views of Gymnasium

References 
 Taganrog Encyclopedia (Энциклопедия Таганрога), 2nd edition, Taganrog, 2003

External links 
 Official web site of Mariinskaya Gymnasium

Educational institutions established in 1861
Gymnasiums in Russia
School buildings completed in 1875
Buildings and structures in Taganrog
Girls' schools in Russia
1861 establishments in the Russian Empire